Kuskunkıran is a village in the Kilis District, Kilis Province, Turkey. The village had a population of 44 in 2022.

In late 19th century, the village was a settlement of 15 houses inhabited by Kurds. The Kurdish population migrated to the region from Besni and belong to the Reşwan tribe.

References

Villages in Kilis District
Kurdish settlements in Kilis Province